Robert Cantwell (c. 1793–1859) was a British architect. He laid out the Norland Estate in Holland Park (north of Holland Park Avenue), where he also designed Royal Crescent. On Holland Park Avenue, he designed terraced houses at Nos. 2–6, and No. 10.

References

1790s births
1859 deaths
People from Marylebone
19th-century English architects
Architects from London